The Ballot Act 1872 was an Act of the Parliament of the United Kingdom that introduced the requirement for parliamentary and local government elections in the United Kingdom to be held by secret ballot. The act abolished the traditional hustings system of nomination and election in Britain.

Background
Employers and landowners had been able to use their sway over employees and tenants to influence the vote, either by being present themselves or by sending representatives to check on the votes as they were being cast. Small retailers were also concerned not to upset their bigger customers by voting differently from them. Radicals, such as the Chartists, had long campaigned for the system to end by the introduction of a secret ballot.

The Representation of the People Act 1867, or Second Reform Act, enfranchised the skilled working class in borough constituencies, and it was felt that their economic circumstances would cause such voters to be particularly susceptible to bribery, intimidation or blackmail. The radical John Bright expressed concerns that tenants would face the threat of eviction if they voted against the wishes of their landlord. It fell to Edward Aldam Leatham, the husband of Bright's sister, to introduce the Ballot Act on leave.

Many in the Establishment had opposed the introduction of a secret ballot. They felt that pressure from patrons on tenants was legitimate and that a secret ballot was simply unmanly and cowardly. Lord Russell voiced his opposition to the creation of a culture of secrecy in elections, which he believed should be public affairs. He saw it as 'an obvious prelude from household to universal suffrage'.

Election spending at the time was unlimited, and many voters would take bribes from both sides. While the secret ballot might have had some effect in reducing corruption in British politics, the Corrupt and Illegal Practices Prevention Act 1883 formalised the position and is seen by many to have been the key legislation in the attempts to end electoral corruption.

The Ballot Act, in combination with the Municipal Elections Act 1875 and the Parliamentary Elections (Returning Officers) Act 1875, is considered to have ushered in today's electoral practices.

Effects
The secret ballot mandated by the Act was first used on 15 August 1872 to re-elect Hugh Childers as MP for Pontefract in a ministerial by-election, following his appointment as Chancellor of the Duchy of Lancaster.  The original ballot box, sealed in wax with a liquorice stamp, is held at Pontefract museum. Of those who voted, 16%, were illiterate, and special arrangements had to be made to record their previously-open oral votes.

The first general election using a secret ballot was in 1874, which saw the first Conservative majority elected since 1841.

The Ballot Act 1872 was of particular importance in Ireland, as it enabled tenants to vote against the landlord class in parliamentary elections. The principal result of the Act was seen in the general election of 1880, which marked the end of a landlord interest in both Ireland and Great Britain.

Although the ballot in the UK is routinely characterized as "secret" the fact that ballot papers are numbered, and that the voter's electoral roll identifier is written on its identically numbered counterfoil by the officer issuing the ballot to the voter at the voting station, means that in principle the identity of a voter can be linked to the ballot they cast.

Abroad
The Act inspired Belgian minister Jules Malou to implement a similar system in Belgium, which he did with the act of 9 July 1877 (la loi du 9 juillet 1877 sur le secret du vote et les fraudes électorales). The elections of 1878 were a victory for the Liberal Party.

See also
 Postal voting
 Reform Acts
 Representation of the People Act

References

Further reading
 Woodall, Robert. "The Ballot Act of 1872" History Today (July 1974), Vol. 24 Issue 7, pp 464–471 online.

United Kingdom Acts of Parliament 1872
Election law in the United Kingdom
Election legislation